Son of David may refer to:

Sons of David
Davidic line
The Messiah
Jesus – see Names and titles of Jesus in the New Testament#Son of David
A Son of David, 1920 film
"Son of David" (song), 2022 song by Ryan Ellis featuring Brandon Lake